Islands of Intrigue is a Nancy Drew and Hardy Boys Supermystery crossover novel, published in 1996.

Plot summary

Alexis Constantine, the daughter of a Greek shipping tycoon, is kidnapped by a shadowy figure, after she invites Bess and Nancy to head to Greece on their world-class yacht. Meanwhile, the Hardys arrive in Greece as well, to hunt down a U.S double agent who is accused of smuggling out a cluster of Phoenix missiles from his homeland base. Working together, the gang head out on a cross-country trip, trying to discover the true solution to the problem at hand.

References

External links
 Islands of Intrigue at Fantastic Fiction
Supermystery series books

Supermystery
1996 American novels
1996 children's books
Novels set in Greece
Novels about missing people